Victor Rendina (December 28, 1916 – July 8, 1985) was an American film and television actor perhaps best known for his portrayal of Philip Tattaglia in the film The Godfather.

Rendina also appeared in television shows including The Honeymooners and Matt Houston, and films such as The Man Who Wasn't There (1983) and Racing with the Moon (1984).

Filmography

References

External links

1916 births
1985 deaths
American people of Italian descent
American male film actors
American male television actors
20th-century American male actors